Joel Chew Joon Herng (born 9 February 2000) is a Singaporean professional footballer who plays as a midfielder for Singapore Premier League club Tampines Rovers.

Club career

Early career
He beats seven other nominees Marc Ryan Tan and Vasileios Chua (both NFA U-15), Khairul Ikhwan Karim and Aizal Murhamdani Ahmad (both NFA U-16), NFA U-17's Rezza Rezky Ramadhani and NFA U-18 duo Danial Syafiq Mustaffa and Nazhiim Harman to win the Dollah Salleh award in 2017.

International career
He was called up to the 2018 AFF U-19 Youth Championship squad.

Style of play
Per U17 national team coach,  Takuya Inoue, he describe Joel as someone who is "small in size, but with good endurance and agility." Joel is known for his playmaking and set piece taking.

Career statistics

Club

Notes

International

U23 International caps

U19 International caps

U16 International caps

U16 International goals
Scores and results list Singapore's goal tally first.

References

Living people
2000 births
Singaporean footballers
Singaporean sportspeople of Chinese descent
Association football midfielders
Singapore Premier League players
Young Lions FC players
Tampines Rovers FC players
Competitors at the 2021 Southeast Asian Games
Southeast Asian Games competitors for Singapore